The Revenue Act of 1940 permanently increased individual income tax rates in the United States, permanently increased corporate tax rates from 19% to 33% and temporarily increased most excise tax rates to 30-50%. The personal exemption fell from $2,500 to $2,000 (married couples).

Tax on corporations

Normal tax 
A Normal Tax was levied on the net income of corporations as shown in the following table.

Tax on individuals 
A normal tax and a surtax were levied against the net income of individuals as shown in the following table.

An exemption of $800 for single filers and $2,000 for married couples and heads of family was allowed, as was a $400 exemption for each dependent under 18.

References

United States federal taxation legislation

1940 in American law
76th United States Congress
United States federal legislation articles without infoboxes